Michel Bassolé (born 18 July 1972) is an Ivorian former professional footballer who played as a midfielder. He played in 25 matches for the Ivory Coast national team from 1990 to 1997. He was also named in Ivory Coast's squad for the 1994 African Cup of Nations tournament.

References

External links
 
 

1972 births
Living people
Ivorian footballers
Association football midfielders
Ivory Coast international footballers
1994 African Cup of Nations players
Ligue 2 players
Championnat National 3 players
ASEC Mimosas players
Muscat Club players
Ettifaq FC players
AC Ajaccio players
Ivorian expatriate footballers
Ivorian expatriate sportspeople in Oman
Expatriate footballers in Oman
Ivorian expatriate sportspeople in Saudi Arabia
Expatriate footballers in Saudi Arabia
Ivorian expatriate sportspeople in France
Expatriate footballers in France